The publishing industry in Pakistan is hampered both by a low literacy rate (65%).

Urdu books

Urdu fiction does date back to prior to pre-independence times when pioneers like Mirza Haadi Ruswa wrote Umrao Jaan Ada. These writers wrote not only to entertain, but to educate the masses, and to revive the culture in Indo-Pak at a time when the society was greatly overshadowed by British values. One recent name in fiction is that of Saadat Nasreen who published her first collection of short stories last year.

Humour is a popular form of fiction. Shafiq Ur Rehman has contributed to this colourful genre of literature.

Translations of major works of English and other languages into Urdu have begun to appear in the market, which range from popular titles like Shakespeare to present age fiction like Harry Potter.

Poetry
Poetry is one of the richest and oldest forms of Urdu literature and Mir Taqi Mir, Ghalib, Allama Iqbal and others had already created a name for themselves before independence. More recently there have been notable poets like Faiz Ahmed Faiz, Ahmed Faraz, Ahmed Nadeem Qasmi, Parveen Shakir and Jaun Elia. 

Poets in the sub-continent, particularly in Pakistan, have focused on a wide range of topics from social awareness, to politics, to religion and even romance.

Children’s literature
A colorful bookshelf full of books is an ideal part of any child's library. Urdu offers a range of books for children from folk tales to poetry to novels and short stories. Recently there has been a trend of writing awareness books of children on issues like health, the environment, and even child abuse. These have received wide appreciation due to their content and good quality printing with illustrations. One popular series is the Mina series initiated by UNICEF.
Other NGOs are also working on such books for children.

Regional books

Saraiki
A large number books are printed in the Saraiki language.

Sindhi
Sindhi is one of the most ancient languages among the regional languages of Pakistan and Sub-continent. The first translation of the Quran was into Sindhi. It has a rich literature ranging from religion, philosophy, medicine, Sociology, Logic, literature, history, politics and culture.

Shah Abdul Latif Bhittai, a writer of Sindhi poetry, is widely read and understood by people all over the world. He wrote Shah jo Risalo. Other popular poets are Sachal Sarmast, and Shaikh Ayaz.

Jamal Abro, Ghulam Rabbani Agro, Ali Baba, Naseem Kharal and Syed Irfan Ali Shah write short stories.

Sindhi Adabi Board, Sindhi Language Authority, Institute of Sindhology, have been involved in publishing many original and translated works into Sindhi. Amongst the works translated is Dry Leaves from Young Egypt by Eastwick in 1973.

Punjabi
Among Pakistan's several regional languages, Punjabi is the closest to Urdu. Many singers have adopted Punjabi to add ‘spice’ to their songs. This have contributed tremendously to the genre of Punjabi poetry. Punjabi literature however, was not as developed as the Sindhi literature. The roots of Punjabi prose can safely be traced back to Baba Nanak's Janam Sakhis, but the lack of attention paid to the medium hampered its growth.

The literary scene was dominated by Urdu even until the 50s and no one paid a second thought to a group of people publishing Punjabi books and taking out a magazine. The Punjabi language publishing world has expanded, however. Last year the Lehran Adabi Board published a book Lehran Behran, which is a collection of critical articles on Punjabi language and literature.

Pashto
Early Pashto writers, after independence, were ‘passive nationalists, progressive nationalists, radical nationalists and Marxists. Except the passive nationalists, almost all of them were politically motivated.’

Pashto literature developed within the Pashto struggle for freedom from what they saw as oppression by the ruling class, and this was clearly reflected in their writings. Pashto writing has moved towards objectivism to subjectivism. The quality of books has also improved considerably.

Balochi
Poetry is the only form of literature in the language which has seen some activity lately. Poetry was and still is a major part of Balochi literature, with a rich history of 600 years.

Mullah Fazul
Book Name
"Shah Lachahkaar" (The Great Poet)

The poetry of classic poet Mullah Fazul was born in house of Chawash Jangiyan Rind in the end of eighteenth century. His family migrated from western Balochistan and settled in Qassmi Chat, Mand Kech Mekran. He and his brother Mulla Qassim a renounce poet of Balochi Language were both widely known for their intelligence from early age. In addition to Balochi they had command of the Arabic and Persian Languages.

The great contribution of Mulla Fazul are simply indistinguishable from evolution of the Balochi Language and the Balochi literature. He introduced numerous innovations such as change of thematic structure in poetry and Language. As known by many, Balochi poetry concentrated on narrative structure or storytelling. However, he introduced many themes that were foreign to this structure such as the social conditions of his people and ballads of patriotism and of the homeland. His departure from the conventional structure also resulted in him introducing new connotations to many classical Balochi words. It is attributed to him to perseverance and the evolution of the Balochi language to this very day. On 30 May 1854 at the age of eighty this popularly loved Baloch poet died. He left behind a wealth of literature to his beloved nation: he was buried in Mand, Balochistan.

Munir Ahmad Badini

90 novels were published in Balochi Language since 10 years,
Most recent novel is "Bahisht-e-Doza" and it is 1200 pages long.

English books

Fiction
It is very difficult to categorize writers in this genre. There are a few very good novel and short story writers who have won accolades not only nationally but also internationally, but it seems hard to draw the line between Pakistani and non-Pakistani writers here. The main problem being the fact that most of these writers are although born in Pakistan but they never really lived here and hence have no contact with their origins.

Zulfikar Ghose’s Murder of Aziz Khan was the first cohesive modern English language novel published in 1967. The plot no doubt was purely a Pakistani theme but the fact remains that Ghose never really did live here and the rest of his novels were set in South America.

In 1980, renowned novelist, Bapsi Sidhwa published her first novel, The Crow Eaters, from England. Ms. Sidhwa is thus far considered to be amongst the best-known authors of Pakistani origin.

Some of the best English literature came from expatriate Pakistanis in the West. One such author, Hanif Kureishi, wrote a haunting memoir, The Rainbow Sign (1986), trying to bring together the two worlds he lived in. Another, Aamer Hussein, wrote a series of acclaimed short story collections.

English literature grew rapidly over the next few years and several writers came on the scene and won international awards.
Adam ZameenZad, Hanif Kureishi, Nadeem Aslam and Bapsi Sidhwa all received several awards for their writings.

In recent years, there has been a crop of younger writers. Amongst them are Bina Shah, Kamila Shamsie, Uzma Aslam Khan and Sehba Sarwar, all who have proved to be authors extraordinary.
Most of these writers, explore the issue of identity for expatriates, for Muslim women, and other social issues. Bina Shah's 786 Cyber Café, for example delves into the lives of three young Pakistani men and a young woman confused about her priorities. Then there is Kamila Shamsie's Kartography, which details the life in Karachi with the protagonists belonging to the elite section of the society. Although it is a riveting tale, it hardly depicts the life in Karachi. Or maybe it does, but then that only a very small faction of our society so full of other social evils.

Since 2000, Uzma Aslam Khan, Mohsin Hamid, Saad Ashraf, Sorayya Khan and Feryal Ali Gauhar have published several consummate new novels. Mohsin Hamid's Moth Smoke was a finalist for the PEN/Hemingway Award and won other awards.
Coming to the present era, in 2004, novels of Nadeem Aslam and Suhyal Saadi, two Pakistani-British authors, were long listed for the 2006 IMPAC Dublin Award. They have also won several other prestigious awards.
Kamila Shamsie's Broken Verses has also been long listed for the 2006 Prince Maurice Award.

A number of poetry collections were also published last year. Pakistani- British, Moniza Ali published her fifth poetry collection How the Stone Found its Voice. The first part of her collection reflects the event after the 9/11 and its effects.

There was also a collection of Faiz's poems published by OUP under the title of Culture and Identity: Selected English Writings of Faiz. In 2007, Mohsin Hamid's The Reluctant Fundamentalist was also published, exploring the effects of 9/11 on a Pakistani man in New York.

Non-fiction
Last year saw a number of good autobiographies like Salma Ahmad's Cutting Free, Rao Rashid's Roller Coaster: My Early Years, Shaukat Mirza's From Exxon to Engro and several others.
Then there was a reprint of Tariq Ali's Street Fighting Years: An Autobiography of the Sixties, Nehru and the Gandhis: An Indian Dynasty.
Another exciting series is that of the historical reprints by Mohatta Palace on Karachi.
In Travelogues there was Salman Rashid's Jhelum: City of Visata.

Previously religious books were published only in Urdu, but in the last few years the trend has changed and now a number of publishers are taking up the task of either translating major works of religion from Urdu to English or are publishing original pieces. One such place is Darussalam which is quite well known for its excellent content and quality.

Children’s books
Although there is a treasure trove of children's books in Urdu, Pakistan fails to provide a good bookshelf of English fiction for children. There have been attempts, but the market is full of international authors like Enid Blyton, Roald Dahl and the popular Sweet Valley, R.L Stine, Famous Five, Hardy Boys series.
Very recently, Mahnaz Malik, a Pakistani born British, published her first story book for children, which serves as a fund raiser project for The Citizen's Foundation. Mo's Star, illustrated by Cora Lynn Deibler and published by Oxford University Press, is the colorful story of a young penguin reaching out for the stars. The book was received with much appreciation from home and abroad, and was unveiled in a colorful launch ceremony held in a local hotel.

Printing and Publishing industry
Very close to the literary scene is the printing and publishing industry as the books are nothing if they do not get a publisher or a printer. Like every other thing in the region, the printing industry is with its own sets of problems the initial ones being the unfavorable socio-economic conditions, lack of mass education and the development of local languages. Given these conditions, the establishment of the publishing industry in present-day Pakistan can be traced back to the nineteenth century. Still, the subject matter of the books dealt mainly with religious or philosophical themes and was also very restrained.

World War I bought newer printing methods, and with these improved printing methods the industry moved a step further towards development. Press now ventured into the realms of subjects as diverse as philosophy, Islamic thought and literary criticism. Even more encouraging was the fact that quality books were being translated from other languages into Urdu where there was a lack expertise. These included chemistry, physics, economics, and political science and commerce books.

Another important milestone was the introduction of the printing of modern novels and short stories. Russian, French and Bengali novels were also translated to add flavor to the local literature.
World War II also bought a significant change in the industry. The printing methods were further improved and the publication industry saw a boost in sales and production with the rising literacy rates and the political awareness in the masses.

Since World War II, the publishing industry has been steadily growing despite the many hurdles like the low purchasing power of the masses and the lack of facilities.
The principle centers of publishing are Karachi, Lahore and Peshawar. Lahore stands out with its numerous publishing houses and has been the hub of the industry from the pre-independence era. Even now, getting a book published from Lahore is much easier than elsewhere.

Pakistan's publishing industry also has a lucrative market for Urdu and religious books abroad. A considerable number of books and periodicals are exported to countries like Malaysia, East Africa and the Middle East. Also, a very large number of books is imported in Pakistan mainly from UK and USA. The Inter-Media Growth program of Pakistan and USA have signed an agreement whereby Pakistan can import books and still pay for them in its local currency.

Emerging trends
Time and technological advancements play a pivotal role in shaping the trends over the passage of time. As Pakistan too enters the digital age, traditional distinctions in media become blurred. This can be negative as well as positive. It can be seen as furthering the book culture but it can also at the same time be seen as the force behind loosening the bond between the book and its reader.

E-books
The biggest contribution of the internet in the book industry would be to digitize books and grant them a wider readership.  A number of online websites have sprung up in the last few decades. Quite a lot of these sites are free and others charge a very nominal fee and provide unlimited access to ebooks. They can either be downloaded or read on screen. These obviously have become popular because of easy accessibility and the low cost.
In Pakistan where a huge majority of people cannot afford the expensive original foreign titles, websites like Project Gutenberg provide an opportunity to familiarize with foreign literature. Even some Urdu websites have started to offer online versions of books for foreign readers. This helps in promoting one's culture as well as to help the expatriate Pakistanis.

Online book stores
Closely related to e-books are the online book stores, another wonder of the internet. An extension of the traditional book stores, online book stores give the option to search and read reviews of books, browse through categories, view the covers, author information, reader ratings and then order these books online. Although they are not free and even charge a shipping fee, its very convenient to search and order books online saving the hassle. Critics however say that it deprives one of having the pleasure of going through new books at a store and discovering exciting new books.

Reading clubs
Though not a new phenomenon, reading clubs are a breath of fresh air into the dying book culture. There are a number of book clubs/reading clubs online and offline. People sit and discuss their favorite books or simply talk about what they are reading these days.

Book fairs
The first International Book Fair was held in Karachi and Lahore last year at the expo centre and it was well received by the public at large despite the fact that all the books were originals and were highly priced. People thronged the premises even if they did not buy much. The sad thing to note was that the Indian publishers had a very impressive collection of reference books on various subjects, while one finds it very difficult to find books on those topics by Pakistani publishers.

Then there are also the annual book fairs held at various places especially in schools, colleges and universities.

Among weekly affairs, the Koocha-e-Saqafat and Frere Hall book fairs are worth a visit. They have a huge collection of books on a wide range of topics. They are usually second hand or reprinted, although it's a clear violation of the copyright law but a large number of Karachiites gather at the spot for book hunting.

Urdu Bazaar at Lahore is the largest market of Paper print, books and stationery in Pakistan. Old Anarkali, Nisbat Road, Mall Road, Nila Gumbad, Lohari gate etc. have numerous small and large bookshops selling new and old (used) books. More than half of the books in Pakistan are printed from Lahore.

Mobile bookshops
The concept of a Mobile Bookshop was first used by the Welcome Book port some years back. Recently, Oxford started its own mobile book shop and it has been touring the city for quite some time now. Set on a truck, with the back converted into a small book shop with shelves and a counter set snugly at the end, the book shop attracted people outside various schools and universities.

Literary Festivals 
There are three major literary festivals that take place in Lahore, Islamabad, and Karachi. The Lahore Literary Festival (LLF) is a major literary event for publishers, booksellers, authors, and readers. Founded by Razi Ahmed in 2012, the LLF "aims to bring together, discuss, and celebrate the diverse and pluralistic literary traditions of Lahore." It has attracted the likes of Mohsin Hamid, Ayesha Jalal, Bapsi Sidhwa, and C.M.Naim. The LLF has also conducted events in New York, in partnership with the Asia Society, and in London. The Karachi Literature Festival (KLF) and Islamabad Literature Festival (ILF) are founded by Ameena Saiyid and Asif Farrukhi, and produced by Oxford University Press. The KLF began in 2010, while the ILF was started in 2013. Much like the LLF, both KLF and ILF attract attention of authors, academics, and publishers. Famous attendees include Intizar Hussain, Amjad Islam Amjad, Kamila Shamsie, Zehra Nigah, and Zia Mohyeddin.

Six literary prizes are awarded at the KLF:
 KLF Coca-Cola prize
 KLF Peace prize
 KLF Embassy of France prize 
 KLF Urdu prize
 KLF Fiction prize 
 Italy Reads Pakistan award

Issues

Copyright infringement of books in Pakistan
The Copyright Ordinance of 1962 came into force in 1967 in Pakistan and has been in effect since then. A number of conditions are given in the ordinance which determines when a work is in violation of copyright.

Pakistan is also a member of Berne Convention on copyright as well as the Universal Copyright Convention.

The boom in the education industry created a vast market for text books, both for school and post-school levels. Where the primary sector is largely catered to by the local textbook boards, there is a serious dearth for books on professional subjects like medical, engineering or business. Thus increased the demand for foreign books. Due to import limitations the prices of these books were totally out of reach of an average Pakistani student. The National Book Foundation was set up to reprint and translate foreign titles with the permission of the original publisher. This was to make the prices affordable and within reach. But even this effort was not as successful as hoped because most of the reprinted titles were either obsolete or were very old editions.

People who recognized this vacuum began a successful industry of illegally copied books. Almost all major tiles were reprinted illegally and were sold at a fraction of the original price. Not only were text books copied and distributed but the recent years have seen a number of local and international fiction works being leaked before the release of original titles in paper back.

The release of the Harry Potter books can be taken as a classic example of this case. The book was all set to be released on 12 August and there was a huge hype surrounding its release. Almost all major book stores throughout the world had millions of books booked prior to the release. Even in Pakistan, a couple of leading bookstores were providing the facility of pre-ordering the book and getting a nominal discount.

The trend of illegally reproducing books is not limited to international bestsellers. Usually one does not find unlicensed versions of books by Pakistani authors so easily but there is a market for such books as well. Tehmina Durrani's My Feudal Lord, Bapsi Sidhwa’s An American Brat, are only but two examples.

When asked about the situation, Bapsi Sidhwa, a leading Pakistani English prose writer, says “Piracy is a problem because of the steep prices. However some pirates are developing a conscience and assigning my previously pirated books to publishers. They have made a packet off me, but so long as books are read, I don't mind as much as I should. If we have more publishers and a larger reading public, the prices could be better controlled.”

There have been numerous raids on Urdu Bazaar shops for selling infringed books but this has done little to deter their suppliers.

Incentives for writers
Those who do not reproduce work and are genuinely interested are hardly encouraged.
How many good writers will actually venture into the field when the encouragement they get is only meager at best? The government, the NGOs and the intellectuals hardly ever take the initiative to encourage young and budding writers of the country. This results in most of the young authors getting their works published under foreign publishers. At least they get the recognition they warrant in foreign waters. Yet, there are a few committed souls who work tirelessly to make a place for themselves in the literature-deprived country.

Decline in reading habits
There has been a visible decline in reading habits in last few decades. This can be attributed to a number of factors like television, internet and other means of entertainment. However, major factor is the increasing high retail prices beyond the buying power of general public.

References

Additional material

See also
Pakistani fiction in English
Pakistani poetry
Pakistani literature

References
Prof Gillani Kamran, Pakistani literature-evolution and trends
Pakistani writers in English: A question of identity
Copyright and book piracy: A country report on Pakistan by M.H. Mirza
Publishing Industry in Pakistan by Zafar Mansoor

External links

Pakistani literature